Cigaritis cilissa is a butterfly of the family Lycaenidae. It is found in Iran, Iraq, Israel, Syria and Turkey.

References

External links
 
 

cilissa
Butterflies described in 1861
Butterflies of Asia
Taxa named by Julius Lederer